WMCM (103.3 FM) is an American radio station broadcasting a country music format simulcasting WBFB. Licensed to Rockland, Maine, United States, the station serves the Mid Coast Maine area.  The station is currently owned by Blueberry Broadcasting.

Programming
Previous to its country music format, the station was a short lived classical music format, the station signed on as a Class A on 93.5 as WRKD-FM, sister to WRKD (1450 AM, later WVOM). WMCM upgraded to 20.6 kw and a frequency change to 103.3 in the late 1980s and became branded as "Real Country 103.3". As of September 28, 2009, it became part of a three-station country network based out of Blueberry's Bangor office, simulcasting WBFB and also heard on WLKE (now WBFE, formerly branded as "Lucky 99.1").

References

External links

MCM
Country radio stations in the United States
Rockland, Maine
Radio stations established in 1968
1968 establishments in Maine
Blueberry Broadcasting radio stations